Barton St David or commonly referred to as Barton is a village and civil parish on the River Brue adjacent to Keinton Mandeville at the foot of Combe Hill in Somerset, England. The village has a population of 561.

History

The parish was part of the hundred of Catsash.

Governance

The parish council has responsibility for local issues, including setting an annual precept (local rate) to cover the council's operating costs and producing annual accounts for public scrutiny. The parish council evaluates local planning applications and works with the local police, district council officers, and neighbourhood watch groups on matters of crime, security, and traffic. The parish council's role also includes initiating projects for the maintenance and repair of parish facilities, as well as consulting with the district council on the maintenance, repair, and improvement of highways, drainage, footpaths, public transport, and street cleaning. Conservation matters (including trees and listed buildings) and environmental issues are also the responsibility of the council.

The village falls within the Non-metropolitan district of South Somerset, which was formed on 1 April 1974 under the Local Government Act 1972, having previously been part of Langport Rural District. The district council is responsible for local planning and building control, local roads, council housing, environmental health, markets and fairs, refuse collection and recycling, cemeteries and crematoria, leisure services, parks, and tourism.

Somerset County Council is responsible for running the largest and most expensive local services such as education, social services, libraries, main roads, public transport, policing and fire services, trading standards, waste disposal and strategic planning.

It is also part of the Somerton and Frome county constituency represented in the House of Commons of the Parliament of the United Kingdom. It elects one Member of Parliament (MP) by the first past the post system of election. It was part of the South West England constituency of the European Parliament prior to Britain leaving the European Union in January 2020, which elected seven MEPs using the d'Hondt method of party-list proportional representation.

Church

The Church of St David has 12th-century origins. The tower, which is octagonal, is in three stages and probably dates from the 15th century. It has been designated by English Heritage as a Grade II* listed building.

Notable inhabitants

Barton St David was the birthplace of Henry Adams (1583–1646), who, after their marriage in nearby Charlton Mackrell, emigrated with his wife Edith and nine children to the new colonies in Massachusetts. He was the great-great-grandfather of John Adams, the first Vice President and second President of the United States. He was also the great-great-great-grandfather of John Quincy Adams, the sixth President of the United States. There is a plaque in the parish church which commemorates this link between the village and the United States.

References

External links
 Village website
 

Villages in South Somerset
Civil parishes in Somerset